Robert Bradley Kassell (born January 7, 1980) is a former American football linebacker. He was signed by the Tennessee Titans as an undrafted free agent in 2002. He played college football at North Texas.

Kassell has also played for the New York Jets.

Kassell currently works as an assistant football coach at Lago Vista High School.

Early years
Kassell attended Llano High School in Llano, Texas and was a letterman in football as a quarterback. In football, as a senior, he rushed for 1431 yards and 20 touchdowns and passed for 839 yards and eight touchdowns, and was named the Class 3A All-West MVP, and won All-State second-team honors. Brad Kassell graduated from Llano High School in 1998.

College career
Kassell was a four-year letterman who played in 44 games at the University of North Texas and was named Sun Belt Conference Defensive Player of the Year during his junior and senior season.  Kassell received a unanimous first-team selection to the conference teams and was team MVP in his final two seasons.  He ranks third on the school's all-time tackle list.

Professional career

Tennessee Titans
In 2002, he was signed as an undrafted free agent by the Tennessee Titans. He played for the team from 2002 to 2005.

New York Jets
In 2006, Kassell was signed as a free agent by the New York Jets. He led the Jets special teams with 26 tackles in 2007. His only professional interception was returned for a touchdown in 2005.

On February 19, 2009, Kassell was released by the Jets.

Catz Sports Performance

In 2012, Kassell joined Catz Sports Performance and Physical Therapy in Austin, TX, where he is President and Partner.

Lago Vista High School

In 2014, he started teaching, and coaching at the Lago Vista High School in Lago Vista, Texas. He coaches the linebacker position during football season, as well as girls track and field.

References

External links
New York Jets bio
Tennessee Titans bio

1980 births
Living people
People from Llano, Texas
American football linebackers
North Texas Mean Green football players
Tennessee Titans players
New York Jets players